Melissa Mojica Rosario (born December 29, 1983) is a Puerto Rican judoka.

Early and personal life
She was born in Trujillo Alto, Puerto Rico, on December 29, 1983. Her parents are Carmelo Mojica and Julia Rosario, and she has two sisters: Melani and Julisa. Mojica went to the Medardo Carazo High School and studied Biology at University of Turabo.

Judo career
Mojica won the bronze medal in both, the open and the over 78 kg division of the 2006 Central American and Caribbean Games. She won the gold medal in the 2008 Pan American Judo Championships in Miami.

She won the gold  medal in the over 78 kg and the open category, as well the silver in the team competition at the 2010 Central American and Caribbean Games, held in her home country, Puerto Rico.

At the 2011 Pan American Games she lost the final to the Cuban Idalys Ortiz to win the silver medal at the +78 kg category in the regional games held in Guadalajara, Mexico.

Mojica won in May 2012, the silver medal at the Moscow Grand Slam, after being defeated by the Brazilian Maria Suelen Altheman who won her category gold medal. At the 2012 Summer Olympics, she defeated the Saudi teenager Wojdan Shaherkani, who competed with a special hijab, in only 82 seconds. After the combat Mojica claimed that she does not care about religious issues, but every woman should have the opportunity to compete at the Olympics. She then lost to Russian Elena Ivashchenko by Ippon in the second round, ending her participation in the +78 kg category at London, United Kingdom.

Achievements

References

External links
 
 
 

1983 births
Living people
People from Trujillo Alto, Puerto Rico
Puerto Rican female judoka
Judoka at the 2007 Pan American Games
Judoka at the 2011 Pan American Games
Judoka at the 2012 Summer Olympics
Judoka at the 2016 Summer Olympics
Judoka at the 2019 Pan American Games
Olympic judoka of Puerto Rico
Pan American Games silver medalists for Puerto Rico
Pan American Games medalists in judo
Central American and Caribbean Games gold medalists for Puerto Rico
Central American and Caribbean Games silver medalists for Puerto Rico
Central American and Caribbean Games bronze medalists for Puerto Rico
Competitors at the 2006 Central American and Caribbean Games
Competitors at the 2010 Central American and Caribbean Games
Competitors at the 2014 Central American and Caribbean Games
Central American and Caribbean Games medalists in judo
Medalists at the 2011 Pan American Games
Medalists at the 2019 Pan American Games
Judoka at the 2020 Summer Olympics
20th-century Puerto Rican women
21st-century Puerto Rican women